Ricardo Serrano Gonzalez (born 4 August 1978 in Valladolid) is a Spanish retired racing cyclist.

Doping sanction
Serrano received a two-year sanction after being caught under the UCI's biological passport programme. Evidence against Serrano was based on an abnormal haematological profile and two laboratory reports indicating the detection of CERA in two of his blood samples. The first anomalies in his passport were from the 2008 season, when Serrano rode for Tinkoff Credit Systems, while the two CERA positives were from 2009, when he rode for Fuji-Servetto.

Professional record 

 1st, Stage 1, 2009 Tour de Romandie
 2007 Giro d'Italia - 102nd
 3rd, Stage 16
 Vuelta a La Rioja - 1 stage, GC & Points Classification (2006)
 GP CTT Correios de Portugal - Mountains Classification (2003)

References

Spanish male cyclists
1978 births
Living people
Doping cases in cycling
Sportspeople from Valladolid
Spanish sportspeople in doping cases
Cyclists from Castile and León
20th-century Spanish people
21st-century Spanish people